Tom Abel (born 1970) is a German cosmologist who first simulated the collapse of a metal-free massive star that belongs to the first generation of stars in the Universe.  This work was done in collaboration with Greg L. Bryan and Michael L. Norman and was published in Science magazine (2002, 295, 93).  He received his Doctor of Philosophy from Ludwig Maximilian University of Munich in 2000.

He is a Professor of Physics at Stanford University in Palo Alto, California and of Particle Physics and Astrophysics at SLAC National Accelerator Laboratory and from 2013 to 2018 served as Director of the Kavli Institute for Particle Astrophysics and Cosmology.

His work with visualization expert Ralf Kaehler has been seen in many planetaria shows including "The Dark Universe" (2013)

Background 
Abel was born in rural Lower Bavaria, Germany.

Work 
His primary interests are:
 Primordial star formation
 Cosmological structure formation and reionization
 Astrophysical fluid dynamics
 Radiative transfer

References

External links
 
 Kavli Institute for Particle Astrophysics and Cosmology homepage
 Stanford homepage

American cosmologists
21st-century American astronomers
Ludwig Maximilian University of Munich alumni
Stanford University Department of Physics faculty
1970 births
Living people
German emigrants to the United States